The 1987–88 NCAA Division III men's ice hockey season began in October 1987 and concluded on March 25 of the following year. This was the 15th season of Division III college ice hockey.

In 1990 the NCAA ruled that Plattsburgh State had violated regulations by allowing some of their players to reside in houses owned by people invested in the ice hockey program and were provided with some measure of benefits including free housing, free meals and cash loans. Because these violations occurred between 1985 and 1988 Plattsburgh State's participation in all NCAA games during that time was vacated. 

Merrimack became the first non-Division I program to receive a bid to the Division I Tournament. As of 2019 no other school outside the top tier has made an appearance in the national championship. The Warriors made the most of their chance, winning two games and reaching the quarterfinals before falling to the eventual national champion Lake Superior State.

Regular season

Season tournaments

Standings

Note: Mini-game are not included in final standings

1988 NCAA Tournament

Note: * denotes overtime period(s)Note: † Plattsburgh State's participation in the tournament was later vacated by the NCAA

See also
 1987–88 NCAA Division I men's ice hockey season

References

External links

 
NCAA